is a private university in Iwata city, Shizuoka Prefecture, Japan, established in 1988.

Location 
 Iwata Campus (1572-1 Ohara, Iwata City, Shizuoka Prefecture)
 Fujieda Campus (4-1-1 Surugadai, Fujieda City, Shizuoka Prefecture)

Organization 
(as of July 2014)

Undergraduate schools

School of Management 
 Department of Management
 Courses: Marketing, Regional Management, and Accounting & Finance.
 Department of Sports Management
 Courses: Sports Management, Sports Education, and Preschool Sports.

School of Information Studies 
 Department of Information Design
 Courses: Visual Expression, Advertising Design, System Design, and Public Management. 
 Department of Communication Studies
 Courses: Regional Business, Tourism Management, International Business, and Public Management.

Facilities

Campuses

Iwata Campus 
 Undergraduate schools: School of Business
 Graduate schools: None
 Other facilities: General Library
 Access: JR Tōkaidō Main Line, Iwata Station

Fujieda Campus 
 Undergraduate schools: School of Information Studies
 Graduate schools: None
 Other facilities: Fujieda Library 
 Access: JR Tōkaidō Main Line, Fujieda Station

References

External links 
 Official website 
 Official Information in English

Educational institutions established in 1988
Private universities and colleges in Japan
Universities and colleges in Shizuoka Prefecture
Iwata, Shizuoka
Fujieda, Shizuoka
1988 establishments in Japan